I Deal in Crime was an American old-time radio detective drama. It was broadcast on ABC from January 21, 1946, until October 18, 1947, and on Mutual from October 25, 1947 until September 4, 1948. In 1947, the title was changed to Ross Dolan, Detective.

Premise
Private detective Ross Dolan returned to investigating crimes after serving in the Navy during World War II. A 10-year veteran as a private investigator, he found clients via ads in The Chronicle and worked for $25 per day, plus expenses. Many of Dolan's cases involved murders, and he often encountered problems with the police as he worked. Dolan narrated the stories, "relating his own reactions to the clues as they occur."

Initially, the program was sustaining. In 1946 the Hastings company (a manufacturer of piston rings) began sponsoring the broadcasts.

Personnel
William Gargan portrayed Ross Dolan, the only featured role on the program. Others often heard in support roles were Hans Conreid, Ted de Corsia, Betty Lou Gerson, Mitzi Gould, Joseph Kearns, and Lurene Tuttle. Dresser Dahlstead was the announcer. Leonard Reeg and Ted Hediger were the director and writer, respectively, and Skitch Henderson and his orchestra provided the music.

References

External links

Logs
Partial log of I Deal in Crime from Jerry Haendiges Vintage Radio Logs
Partial log of I Deal in Crime from Old Time Radio Researchers Group
Partial log of I Deal in Crime from radioGOLDINdex

Streaming
Episodes of I Deal in Crime from Dumb.com
Episodes of I Deal in Crime from Internet Archive
Episodes of I Deal in Crime from Old Radio Programs
Episodes of I Deal in Crime from Old Time Radio Researchers Group Library

1946 radio programme debuts
1948 radio programme endings
1940s American radio programs
ABC radio programs
Mutual Broadcasting System programs
Detective radio shows
American radio dramas